Matricaria occidentalis, commonly known as valley mayweed, is an annual plant native to North America. It is in the family Asteraceae.

Description
The stem is either branching or below the corymbose summit. It is used as substitute for chamomile.

Distribution and habitat
Usually occurs in wetlands, but occasionally found in non wetlands. It is native to California and Oregon.

References

External links
USDA Plants Profile for Matricaria occidentalis (Valley mayweed)
Jepson eFlora Taxon page for Matricaria occidentalis
Calflora Taxon Report for Matricaria occidentalis

Matricaria
Flora of the Northwestern United States
Flora of the Southwestern United States
Flora of the Sierra Nevada (United States)
Flora of California
Flora of Oregon
Flora without expected TNC conservation status